Walter Herriot OBE, was the managing director of St John's Innovation Centre, Cambridge. In 2006, he was awarded the Queen's Award for Enterprise Promotion.

References

Queen's Award for Enterprise Promotion (2006)
British businesspeople
Living people
Year of birth missing (living people)